The Morgan 4/4 is a British motor car which was produced by the Morgan Motor Company from 1936 to 2019. It was Morgan's first car with four wheels, the name indicating that the model has four wheels and four cylinders (earlier Morgans had been three-wheelers, typically with V-twin engines).  Early publicity and advertising material variously referred to the model as "4/4", "4-4", "Four Four" and similar names, but from the outset the factory designation was always "4/4". 

Apart from a break during World War II (and the period March 1951 to September 1955) the 4/4 has been in continuous production from its debut to the present day. Engine capacity has increased from the 1,122 cc Coventry Climax engine in 1936 to a 1.8-litre Ford engine in 2004, although it is currently back down to 1,595 cc.

4/4 Two-Seater
{{Infobox automobile
| name         = Morgan 4/4 Series I
| image        = Bonhams - The Paris Sale 2012 - Morgan 4 4 Sports - 1947 - 001.jpg
|caption=Morgan 4/4 Sports two-seater, 1947
| production   = 1936–19501,720 made
| engine       = 1.1 L Coventry Climax I41.2 L Standard I4
| length       = 
| width        = 
| wheelbase    = 
| height       = 
}}

The original open two-seater 4/4 was introduced in 1936 and became the most popular of the three body options available. 663 were built by 1939 and 249 more from 1946 to 1950, representing 53% of the overall production.

A four-speed Meadows gearbox was used until 1938, then a Moss gearbox.

4/4 Four-Seater
The four-seat version was introduced in 1937 and 99 were built by 1939 and a further 140 from 1946 to 1950.

4/4 Drophead Coupé
The Drophead Coupé was introduced in 1938 with 58 built by 1939 and another 106 from 1946 to 1950. This has a better folding roof and permanent window frames, along with certain other creature comforts.

4/4 Series II

The Series II was introduced in 1955 with 386 built by October 1960. Although very similar in appearance to the model it replaced, it was virtually a new car with a chassis based on the one used in the Morgan Plus 4. The traditional independent front suspension using sliding pillars and coil springs was fitted with a rigid axle and semi-elliptic leaf springs at the rear. Disc wheels were fitted as standard items.

A side-valve 1,172 cc Ford 100E engine was used with a Ford three-speed gearbox. The engine produced 36 bhp. Hydraulic brakes with  drums were fitted. It was also available in  'Competition' form with Aquaplane head conversion, twin S.U. carburettors, and an improved gearshift linkage.

Inside there was a bench seat back and individual squabs covered in PVC, with leather as an option, and rubber floor covering. A heater was available as an option as was a rev counter and more surprisingly, direction indicators.

The test car cost £713 including taxes.

4/4 Series III

The short-lived Series III was introduced in October 1960 and 58 were built by November 1961 when the Series IV arrived. The chassis was essentially the same as that used on the Series II but the track was increased by 2 inches (50 mm). Hydraulic shock absorbers replaced the old Hartford friction type.

A  overhead valve 997 cc Ford Anglia 105E engine and Ford four-speed gearbox were used.

4/4 Series IV

The Series IV introduced October 1961 with 114 built by March 1963 had a 62 bhp, 1340 cc, Ford Classic 109E engine and Ford four-speed gearbox. The test car cost £729 including taxes on the home market.

4/4 Series V

The Series V was introduced in February 1963 with 639 built by March 1968.

A 65 bhp, 1498 cc, Ford Cortina 116E engine and Ford four-speed gearbox were used.

4/4 1600

The car was further updated in 1968 to become the 1600 with two- and four-seat open bodies available.

Ford Kent Crossflow engine
The 4/4 1600 was introduced in February 1968 fitted with a variety of Ford 1599 cc Kent engines of type 2737E (70 bhp), type 2737GT (95.5 bhp) and type 2265E (95.5 bhp) from 1971 and a Ford four-speed gearbox.

A total of 3513 were built by March 1982.

Fiat Twin-Cam engine
Introduced in November 1981 was a  Fiat 1584 cc twin-cam engine and five-speed Fiat gearbox.

96 were built by November 1985.

Ford CVH engine
Introduced in March 1982 with a Ford 1597 cc CVH engine and Ford four-speed gearbox until 1984, then a Ford five-speed gearbox from Ford Sierra. From 1986 steering was changed from the original cam and peg to a Gemmer recirculating ball system.

1652 were built by November 1991.

Ford CVH EFI engine
From November 1991 a  Ford 1597 cc CVH engine with electronic fuel injection was used. 187 were built by January 1993, when the 1800 version was introduced.

4/4 1800

Ford Zetec engine

Starting in April 1993 the Morgan 4/4 used a  Ford 1,796 cc 16-valve Zetec R engine.

Runabout
In 2003 Morgan launched a new entry level model named the Runabout based on the 4/4. It was available in three standard colours only with a standard no-option specification. The Runabout could be recognised by the reduced number of bonnet louvres.

Ford Duratec engine

From 2006 to 2009 the 4/4 sported a  Ford Duratec 1,798 cc 16-valve all-alloy engine. On these models the exhaust is on the right side. In January 2006 a "70th Anniversary Special edition" was presented, celebrating 70 years having passed since the introduction of the 4/4. This received black paint and special wheels, similar to those used on the original "flat-rad" Morgan. 142 were planned to be made. In spite of seventy years of production, the accumulated figure had not yet reached 10,000 in 2006.

4/4 1.6 Litre (2009–2018)

From 2009 to 2018 the Ford Sigma engine used is 1,595 cc and produces , enough for a  top speed. The engine drives the rear wheels via a five-speed manual gearbox. Initially a Ford gearbox was used, then from 2012 a Mazda unit was fitted. 
In 2018 the model was discontinued for European and North American markets as the engine does not pass the latest emission regulations.

References

Notes

Bibliography

External links
Morgan Workshop Manual

4
Cars introduced in 1936
1940s cars
1950s cars
1960s cars
1970s cars
1980s cars
1990s cars
2000s cars
2010s cars